Don King (born February 1926) is a former American football player and coach. He served as the head coach at the University of Hawaii for one season, in 1967.  King came to Hawaii in 1966 as an assistant under Phil Sarboe.  From 1963 to 1965, he served as the head football coach at Shasta College, compiling a record of 11–15.  King played football at Hughson Union High School in Hughson, California, Modesto Junior College, and Fresno State College.

Head coaching record

References

1926 births
Possibly living people
Fresno State Bulldogs football players
Hawaii Rainbow Warriors football coaches
Junior college football coaches in the United States
People from Stanislaus County, California